Sekolah Menengah Kebangsaan Hamid Khan is a secondary school (high school) in Island Glades, Penang, Malaysia. The school has approximately 750 students. The average passes every year for the national level examinations SPM and PMR is well above 90%.

School song
Hidup Sambil Belajar

Murid-murid dengan hati bersatu penuh semangat membara

Mendapat didikan serta ilmu demi kemakmuran negara

Menghadapi segala cabaran mengatasi segala bebanan

Rajin berusaha dalam pelajaran dan cemerlang di bidang sukan

Bertabah hati, yakinkan diri, hidup adil saksama

Sentiasa bersyukur, mencintai yang luhur dan bertimbang rasa,

Dengan hasrat untuk menjayakan cita sumpah dan ikrar,

Di Sekolah Menengah Hamid Khan kami hidup sambil belajar.

Subjects
The subjects are divided into two levels, the lower secondary (forms 1 to 3) and the upper secondary (forms 4 and 5). Form 3 students will sit for the PT3 public examination and Form 5 students will be sitting for their SPM (Sijil Pelajaran Malaysia). public examination at the end of their second schooling semester. In P.T.3, the core subjects taken are:
 English Language
 Malay Language
 Mathematics
 Geography
 History
 Living Skills (Kemahiran Hidup)
 Science
 Islamic Education (Pendidikan Islam)

The subjects taken in S.P.M. are:
English Language, Malay Language, Additional Mathematics, Modern Mathematics, Physics, Chemistry, Biology, History, Science (for the arts and accounting streams) and Islamic Studies (Moral Studies for non-Muslim students).
 subjects are based on students majoring in science

A Brief History
By the end of 1976, this school had two blocks (two storeys high) which consists of a general office, principal's office, vice principal's office, teacher's room, a library, two science labs, an art room and fourteen class rooms.

Originally, it was an all-girls school which was called Island Glades Girls School. It was then changed to Sekolah Menengah Island Glades as they changed it into a mixed school. Finally, the name Sekolah Menengah Kebangsaan Hamid Khan was given in honour of Captain Hamid Khan who played a significant role in the education ministry before Malaysia's independence.

In 1977, this school had 272 students and twelve teachers. This school was then officiated by the Education Minister, Y.B.Dr. Michael Toyad on 25 July 1977.

Headmaster
 1977-1978    :Oh Eu Kok
 1979         :Ung Kim Cheng
 1980-1981    :Ang Thoon Seng
 1982         :Leow Lim Hai
 1982-1987    :Tuan Haji Mohd. Ismail bin Ibramsa
 1987-1990    :Tuan Haji Mohd. Daud bin Haji Mohamed
 1990-1992    :Mohd Tahir bin Mydin
 1992-1993    :Ahmad bin Hashim 
 1994-1995    :Azlan bin Abu Bakar
 1995-1999    :Tuan Shaikh Mohamed bin Shaikh Ahmad Baladram
 2000-2004    :Lee Teong Aun
 2004-2008    :Joseph Wong Kee Kuok
 2009-2015    :Norizan Bt. Abd. Rashid
 2015–2020    :Baskaran a/l Karuppiah
 2020-present :Thirumamani a/l Sundaraj

External links
 http://smkhamidkhan.edu.my

Schools in Penang
Secondary schools in Malaysia
Educational institutions established in 1977
1977 establishments in Malaysia